Mister World 2016 was the 9th edition of the Mister World competition. It was held at the Floral Hall of the Southport Convention Centre in Southport, England on July 19, 2016. Nicklas Pedersen of Denmark crowned Rohit Khandelwal of India at the end of the event.

Results

Placements

Order of Announcements

Fast Track Events

Judges
The judges' panel for Mister World 2014 consisted of the following personalities:
Julia Morley – Chairman and CEO of Miss World LTD
Juan García Postigo – Mister World 2007 from Spain
Francisco Escobar – Mister World 2012 from Colombia
Carina Tyrrell – Miss England 2014

Contestants
46 contestants competed for the title

Notes

Debuts

Returns
Last competed in 2003:
 

Last competed in 2010:
 
 
 
 
 

Last competed in 2012:

Crossovers
Manhunt International
 2012:  – Armand du Plessis
 2016:  – Daniel Antonio Alfaro Barrantes
 2016:  – Christopher Joseph Bramell (2nd runner-up)

Mister International
 2013:  – Sergio Isaac Lopés Goti
 2015:  – Rafał Jonkisz
 2015:  – Fernando Alberto Álvarez Soto (Top 10)
 2015:  – Jake Elwood John Seneratne

Mister Supranational
 2016:  – Rafał Jonkisz (Top 10)

Mister Global
 2017:  – Christopher Joseph Bramell (2nd runner-up)
 2018:  – Betim Morina

Mister Universal Ambassador
 2015:  – Mohammad Yusuf Bin Tony

Mister Model International
 2013:  – Edson Janyny Bonilla Álvarez
 2015:  – Alan Jhunior Massa Caycho

References

External links
 

Mister World
2016 in England
2016 beauty pageants
Beauty pageants in England
July 2016 events in the United Kingdom